Wazobia 95.1 FM Lagos is a  Nigerian Pidgin English radio station in Lagos state. It was founded in 2007 and belongs to Globe Communications Limited.

Wazobia Fm Lagos is known for its humorous approach to broadcasting. The radio station airs a mixture of news, features, sport, music (from popular Nigerian music, hip hop, highlife to world music and reggae), talk shows, topical issues and interviews.

Reviews

"Owogram.com" listed Wazobia Fm Lagos as number one out of 10 best radio stations in Lagos State, adding that "It is the most favorite radio station visited by most Nigerians, especially in Lagos. It is the first pidgin radio station in Nigeria and produces programs in Pidgin English, thereby enjoyed by all categories of people; it is a comfortable station for all."

"Alternative Adverts" listed the radio station as number one in their top 10 list of most visited radio stations in Lagos State, 2019. They also added that "Wazobia FM is both listened and enjoyed by all categories of people; bus drivers, workers, students, market women, etc. It is a comfortable station for all."

Shows

 Una wake up show
 Our Backyard
 You and Yaw
 Market Runz
 Oga Madam
 Kulele Zone
 Evening Oyoyo
 Night Joli

Presenters

 Yaw (Steve Onu) 
 CheChe Smith
 Ratata 
 Uzomatic zo
 Ikechukwu Oyemike

See also

 List of radio stations in Nigeria
 Media of Nigeria
 Wazobia Fm Onitsha
 Wazobia FM Port harcourt

References

External links
 

Radio stations in Nigeria
Radio stations in Lagos
2007 establishments in Nigeria
Radio stations established in 2007
Privately held companies of Nigeria
World music radio stations
Wazobia FM